Diphlebia hybridoides is a species of Australian damselfly in the family Lestoideidae,
commonly known as a giant rockmaster. 
It is endemic to north-eastern Queensland, where it inhabits streams in forests.

Diphlebia hybridoides is a large, solid-looking damselfly with striking blue-grey and black colouring. It sits with its dark-banded wings spread out.

Gallery

See also
 List of Odonata species of Australia

References 

Lestoideidae
Odonata of Australia
Insects of Australia
Endemic fauna of Australia
Taxa named by Robert John Tillyard
Insects described in 1912
Damselflies